On the Verge of Destruction 1992.1.7 Tokyo Dome Live is a live album released by X Japan on January 1, 1995. It contains the band's performance at the Tokyo Dome on January 7, 1992, which was the last with Taiji Sawada on bass. The album reached number 3 on the Oricon chart. There is also a VHS version (later re-released on DVD) with the same name.

Track listing 
Disc one
 "Prologue ~ World Anthem" (S.E)
 "Silent Jealousy"
 "Sadistic Desire"
 "Desperate Angel"
 "Standing Sex"
 "Week End"
 "Drum Solo"
 "Hide no Heya" (HIDEの部屋)
 "Voiceless Screaming"

Disc two
 "Piano Solo ~ Swan Lake"
 "Es Dur no Piano Sen" (Es Durのピアノ線)
 "Unfinished"
 "Celebration"
 "Orgasm" (オルガスム)
 "Kurenai" (紅)
 "Joker"
 "X"
 "Endless Rain"

References 

X Japan live albums
Albums recorded at the Tokyo Dome
1995 live albums